Kodjo Mavunio Ludwig Amla (born November 13, 2000) is a Danish professional footballer who plays for HFX Wanderers of the Canadian Premier League.

Early life 
Amla is of Togolese descent and was born in Skjern, Denmark, but grew up in Canada from a young age and holds a Canadian passport. He began playing football at the age of six with the B.67 soccer organization in Denmark. In 2011, he moved to Canada, where he played youth football with Cosmos de Granby, CS Longueuil, and FC Saint-Hyacinthe.

He played college soccer at Collège Ahuntsic. In 2018, he was named Championship MVP and was an RSEQ Division I regular season all-star and championship all-star, as his team won the gold medal. Soonafter, he had offers to join American universities to play college soccer, but he elected to turn professional instead.

Club career
He began his senior career with CS St-Hubert in the Première ligue de soccer du Québec.

In February 2021, he began training with Makedonija GP in the Macedonian First Football League. On February 12, he signed a two-year contract with the club. He scored his first goal on March 6 against FK Sileks.

In 2022, he returned to CS St-Hubert. He scored a hat trick on July 16 against AS Blainville and scored two goals in a friendly against HFX Wanderers U23 on July 27.

On July 30, 2022, he signed a contract through the 2023 season, with an option for 2024 with Canadian Premier League club HFX Wanderers FC, after trialing with the club for a couple of weeks and playing in the friendly against the HFX U23 side for his former club CS St-Hubert, in which he scored 2 goals in a 3-2 victory for St-Hubert. He made his debut for the Wanderers on August 1 against York United FC.

Career statistics

Club

References

External links
 

2000 births
Living people
People from Ringkøbing-Skjern Municipality
Danish men's footballers
Canadian soccer players
Danish emigrants to Canada
Danish people of Togolese descent
Canadian people of Togolese descent
Association football forwards
CS Longueuil players
CS St-Hubert players
FK Makedonija Gjorče Petrov players
HFX Wanderers FC players
Première ligue de soccer du Québec players
Macedonian First Football League players
Canadian Premier League players